Football Club Shirak, commonly known as Shirak, is an Armenian professional sports club based in Gyumri. Shirak is known for its professional football team which is one of the oldest football clubs in Armenia, having been created in 1958. The club is the only team that participated in all seasons of the Armenian Premier League since its creation in 1992 until 2021. Shirak is one of the more successful clubs in Armenia, having won a total of 11 domestic titles including four Armenian Premier League titles, two Armenian Cup, and five Armenian Super Cup.

Shirak has yet to qualify for an international tournament playoff round, yet frequently plays UEFA Champions League and UEFA Europa League qualifying matches.

Shirak's home stadium is the 4,500 seater Gyumri City Stadium, the oldest venue in Armenia. Shirak's youth academy has also produced successful players, including Artur Petrosyan and Harutyun Vardanyan.

History
Shirak was founded in Gyumri in 1958, when Armenia was still a part of the Soviet Union. The club was originally named Shirak Leninakan, the latter being the name for Gyumri during the Soviet Union. From its creation to the fall of the Soviet Union, Shirak played all its matches in the Soviet third division First League.

Following the fall of the Soviet Union and the renaming of Leninakan, Shirak changed its name to Shirak Kumayri, and was placed in the Armenian Premier League with head coach Andranik Adamyan in charge.

1992 was the first Armenian Premier League season played in history, which ended with Shirak and Pyunik tied at the top with 37 points each. After failing to agree on a tie-breaking match, it was decided to award the title to both teams. Thus, Shirak managed to win the league in the first domestic league in Armenian history.

Shirak once again changed its name in late 1992 after the name Kumayri was changed for Gyumri. Therefore 1993 was the first appearance as Shirak Gyumri in the Armenian Premier League. After finishing second in the 1993 league season, Shirak qualified to the Armenian Cup final for the first time, yet failed to claim the title after losing 3-1 to Ararat.

Shirak went on to win the 1994 and 1995 seasons, however was not given the 1995 title due to it being a transitional spring season.

The next four seasons were not successful for the club, however Shirak managed to claim the league title again in 1999, with striker Arayik Adamyan scoring 16 goals. The league title would end up being the last title Shirak would win until the 2011-12 Armenian Cup.

Shirak would eventually go on to win the 2012-13 Armenian Premier League and the 2016-17 Armenian Cup final.

Domestic history since 1992

European

Kit and badge
For most of the club's history, the team's colours were orange and black, inspired on the dominant colours present in Gyumri's architecture, specifically the Holy Saviour's Church, located in the city.

As of 2019, Shirak has reached an agreement with Swiss sportswear company Fourteen to provide all match and training apparel.

Kit suppliers and shirt sponsors

Badge
The club's current badge design was inspired by Gyumri's seal, with the main feature being the lion and cross which were present on the flag of the Bagratuni dynasty, which ruled Bagratid Armenia during the middle ages.

Stadium

Shirak's home stadium has always been the Gyumri City Stadium, built in 1924 and currently the oldest football stadium in the country. Following renovation works in 1999, the stadium became an all-seater stadium with a capacity for 2,844. The stadium pitch and facilities were upgraded in 2012 to meet all UEFA stadium regulations, allowing Shirak to play its UEFA Champions League and UEFA Europa League qualifying matches at home.

The stadium capacity was once again increased, this time to the current 4,500 capacity following a second round of renovations in 2019. These renovations included new seating in the south end of the stadium.

List of stadiums used by the club
 Gyumri City Stadium: 1958-

Supporters

Shirak's fans are known as the Black Panthers, in honor of the panther that appears on the flag of the Bagratid dynasty. Shirak's supporters are also considered to be one of the best in Armenian football, with high match attendance and active supporters during matches. Supporters have rioted against club management when the club failed to reach desired results in the past.

Rivalries
Shirak's main rival is considered to be Gandzasar. This rivalry grew as both teams were the only teams in the league that weren't from Yerevan, and thus competed to be the best team from the provinces.

Players

Current squad

Out on loan

Technical staff

Institutional

Executive board 
Arman Sahakyan has been the President of Shirak since he purchased the club in 2010.

Staff 
 Technical director: Georgi Matevosyan
 Sporting director: Andranik Adamyan
 Press Secretary: Arman Maloyan
 Administrator: Suren Simonyan

Honours

National

League
 Armenian Premier League (4): 1992, 1994, 1999, 2012–13

National cups
 Armenian Cup (2): 2011–12, 2016-17
 Armenian Super Cup (5):1997, 2000, 2003, 2013, 2017

Other sports sections

Football reserves and academy
Shirak's youth academy has produced several notable players throughout its history. Artur Petrosyan is the most prominent academy product, having a successful career in Armenia and European football.

Shirak's reserves compete in the Armenian First League, the second division in Armenian football. The reserves are currently coached by Tigran Davtyan and also play their matches at the Gyumri City Stadium.

Futsal
On 8 September 2017, prior to the beginning of the 2017-18 Armenian Futsal Premier League season, Shirak Sports Club took over the Gyumri Futsal club, who were a founding member of the domestic futsal championship in Armenia which began in 1998. As a result, the futsal team was re-branded as Shirak SC Futsal.

Basketball
On 19 September 2017, Shirak announced the creation of a basketball team that would compete in the newly created Armenia Basketball League A.

References

External links
 Official website

 
Shirak
Association football clubs established in 1958
1958 establishments in Armenia